Mohanthal is a traditional Indian confectionery item that can be described as a gram flour fudge. It is common in the Rajasthan and Gujarat regions. Mohanthal is made from besan, ghee, and sugar and can be combined with many other ingredients, such as spices and nuts. As with other sweets from the Indian subcontinent it is commonly consumed at religious festivals such as Diwali or as prasad, an offering at a temple or shrine.

References 

Gujarati cuisine
Indian desserts
Rajasthani desserts